Boyers Junction is an unincorporated community in Berks County, Pennsylvania, United States. The village is located in southwestern Rockland Township, near the Ruscombmanor Township line. It is also southeast of Fleetwood and south of Lyons. It is drained by the Bieber Creek southward into the Manatawny Creek, a tributary of the Schuylkill River. The Brandywine Heights Area School District serves Boyers Junction, which uses the Fleetwood zip code of 19522. 

Unincorporated communities in Berks County, Pennsylvania
Unincorporated communities in Pennsylvania